Drymaria is a genus of plants in the family Caryophyllaceae. It contains many species including these from northeastern Mexico:

Drymaria coahuilana
Drymaria cordata
Drymaria lyropetala
Drymaria monticola
Drymaria pattersonii
Drymaria pratheri

References

Caryophyllaceae
Caryophyllaceae genera